Imbue is the fourth studio album by The Early November.

Release
On March 10, 2015, "Narrow Mouth" was premiered through Billboard website. A music video was released for "Better This Way" on April 30. It was filmed during a show where the group had debuted the track. In April and May, the group went on a tour of the UK and Europe with support from You Blew It! and A Great Big Pile of Leaves. Imbue was released on May 12 through Rise Records. Following this, the group embarked on a US tour which lasted until June. They were supported by Lydia and Restorations. On May 17, a music video was released for "Boxing Timelines". In August and September, the group went on tour with Bayside and Better Off. On June 14, 2016, a music video was released for "Narrow Mouth".

Track listing
All songs written by Ace Enders.
 "Narrow Mouth" - 4:31
 "Better This Way" - 3:31
 "Magnolia" - 3:33
 "The Negatives" - 4:16
 "Boxing Timelines" - 4:34
 "Circulation" - 4:38
 "Harmony" - 3:41
 "Cyanide" - 3:37
 "I Don't Care" - 4:15
 "Nothing Lasts Forever" - 3:44
 “Digital Age” - 4:04

Personnel

 Arthur "Ace" Enders – vocals, rhythm guitar 
 Jeff Kummer – drums
 Joseph Marro – guitar, keyboard, piano
 Bill Lugg – lead guitar
 Sergio Anello – bass
Photography - Danielle Parsons

Charts

References

The Early November albums
2015 albums
Rise Records albums